Cofi is one of the regional accents and dialects of the Welsh language found in north Wales, and centred on Caernarfon, in Gwynedd,  and its surrounding district.

Cofi has been called ‘one of Wales’ most famous regional dialects.’ In 2011, the Welsh television production company  organised a special event at Caernarfon Football Club celebrating the Cofi dialect.

According to broadcaster Mari Gwilym, ‘Cofis are straight as arrows and we are extremely proud of the Cofi dialect as it is a real asset to Wales. Caernarfon has earned a reputation throughout Wales as the town of the Cofis which I think is great because it’s an extremely important part of their heritage’

The Cofi dialect has been ‘immortalized’ in the radio monologues of Richard Hughes and in William Owen's stories  (1961) 

The actor Dewi Rhys is a Cofi. He has written a book on Cofi humour called . He comments:‘I don’t think we as Cofis try and be individual, but we just are. We like to think that we’re life’s losers, but we look forward to getting out there and doing different things. When you first meet a Cofi, you’re usually greeted with this deadpan sort of look, you can never tell what’s going through their minds. That’s probably down to shyness or a desire to be left alone. I think it’s fair to say that you don’t get much small talk with a Cofi’ 

The National Museum of Wales has a recording of Gareth Wyn Jones, speaking the Cofi dialect.

 is an opera in the Cofi dialect which has been produced with the help of children from the  housing estate in Caernarfon.  The idea behind the ‘Cofi Opera’ is to create, produce and perform an opera with children from the estate performing alongside professional opera singers; the opera forms part of the  project based in Caernarfon's  Centre. The opera has been produced with the help of Caernarfon poet Meirion MacIntyre Hughes, composer Owain Llwyd and rapper Ed Holden

References

External links
 Examples of Cofi slang
 The Welsh Language today

Welsh dialects
Caernarfon
History of Gwynedd